Brooksee is a lake in the Rostock district in Mecklenburg-Vorpommern, Germany. At an elevation of 23.9 m, its surface area is 0.114 km².

Lakes of Mecklenburg-Western Pomerania